Sappemeer Oost (abbreviation: Spm), previously named Borgercompagniesterweg (1887–1900), was an unstaffed railway station in Sappemeer in the Netherlands. It was located on the Harlingen–Nieuweschans railway between Hoogezand-Sappemeer and Zuidbroek.

Train services started on 1 January 1887 and have since been provided by Maatschappij tot Exploitatie van Staatsspoorwegen (1887–1937), Nederlandse Spoorwegen (1938–2000), NoordNed (2000–2005), and Arriva (2005–present). There was a station building between 1891 and 1973, which was replaced by a shelter. The station was definitely closed in 2020.

The station has two tracks and two platforms. Before the station was closed, there were three local train services with four trains per hour to and from Groningen, two trains to and from Veendam, and two trains to and from Bad Nieuweschans.

Location 
The railway station is located at the Borgercompagniesterstraat in the village of Sappemeer in the province of Groningen in the northeast of the Netherlands. It is situated on the Harlingen–Nieuweschans railway between the railway stations of Hoogezand-Sappemeer in the west and Zuidbroek in the east. The Scholte railway stop was between Sappemeer Oost and Zuidbroek from 1933 to 1935.

History 
The segment of the Harlingen–Nieuweschans railway between Groningen and Winschoten was opened on 1 May 1868, when train services started at the nearby Hoogezand-Sappemeer railway station. From 1 January 1887, trains also call at Borgercompagniesterweg, the former name of Sappemeer Oost. Initially, the trains were operated by the Maatschappij tot Exploitatie van Staatsspoorwegen (Company for the Exploitation of the State Railways). In 1891, the station building of the type Visvliet was completed.

In 1900, the railway station was renamed from Borgercompagniesterweg to Sappemeer Oost. In 1917, the station building was expanded with a third class waiting room. In 1938, the Maatschappij tot Exploitatie van Staatsspoorwegen merged with the Hollandsche IJzeren Spoorweg-Maatschappij (Hollandic Iron Railroad Company) and became the train operator Nederlandse Spoorwegen (Netherlands Railways). In 1973, the station building was demolished and replaced by a simple shelter.

Since 2000, trains have been operated by NoordNed, which became Arriva in 2005.

Station layout 

The double-track railway through Sappemeer is unelectrified and oriented west to east. At the station are two platforms, platform 1 on the north side of the northern track and platform 2 on the south side of the southern track, that are on separate sides of a level crossing of the public road.

Train services

Bus services

There is no bus service at this station. The nearest bus stop is Noorderstraat in Sappemeer.

References

External links 
 Sappemeer Oost station, station information

1887 establishments in the Netherlands
Buildings and structures completed in 1891
Buildings and structures demolished in 1973
Railway stations in Groningen (province)
Railway stations on the Staatslijn B
Railway stations opened in 1887
Transport in Midden-Groningen
Railway stations in the Netherlands opened in the 19th century